Intraoral dental sinus (also termed a parulis and commonly, a gumboil) is an oral lesion characterized by a soft erythematous papule (red spot) that develops on the alveolar process in association with a non-vital tooth and accompanying dental abscess. A parulis is made up of inflamed granulation tissue.

Less commonly, dental infections drain onto the surface of the skin, forming a cutaneous sinus of dental origin.

References 

Conditions of the mucous membranes
Oral mucosal pathology